Our Lady of the Rosary is a 1650-1655 oil on canvas painting of Our Lady of the Rosary by Bartolomé Esteban Murillo, previously in the El Escorial Monastery and Palacio Real de Madrid and now in the Museo del Prado in Madrid.

References

Bibliography (in Spanish)
García Algarra, Francisco Javier (2002). Entorno histórico. «'La Sagrada Familia del Pajarito' de Bartolomé Esteban Murillo». Programa Doctorado Hª del Arte.
Hellwig, Karing (2007). «Pintura del siglo XVII en Italia, España y Francia». El Barroco. Arquitectura. Escultura. Pintura. h.f.Ullmann. ISBN 978-3-8331-4659-6.
Martínez, María José (1992). «Estudio de la obra seleccionada». Murillo. Valencia: Ediciones Rayuela. ISBN 84-7915-082-3.
Morales Martín, José Luis (1987). Historia Universal del Arte. Barroco y Rococó. Volumen VII. Barcelona: Ed. Planeta. ISBN 84-320-6687-7.
Mâle, Emile (2002). El arte religioso de la Contrarreforma: Estudios sobre la iconografía del final del s. XVI y de los ss. XVII y XVIII. Encuentro. ISBN 978-84-7490-643-1.
Valdivieso, Enrique (1992). «Murillo, la realidad y el éxtasis». Murillo. Valencia: Ediciones Rayuela. ISBN 84-7915-082-3.

External links 

 Catalogue page
 Catálogo descriptivo é histórico del Museo del Prado de Madrid (1872) por Pedro de Madrazo y Kuntz pp. 477-478 

Paintings by Bartolomé Esteban Murillo in the Museo del Prado
1650s paintings
Paintings of the Madonna and Child